Liulin-type is a class of spectrometry-dosimetry instruments.

History 
The first Liulin device was developed in 1986–1988 time period for the scientific program of the second Bulgarian cosmonaut for the flight on MIR space station.

All Liulin type dosimetric instruments use one or more silicon detectors and measure the deposited energy and number of particles into the detector(s) when charged particles hit the device, that allowing it to calculate the dose rate and particle flux.

The measurements in the LIULIN instrument were based on a single silicon detector followed by a charge-sensitive shaping amplifier (CSA). The number of the pulses at the output of CSA above a given threshold was proportional to the particle flux hitting the detector; the amplitude of the pulses at the output of CSA was proportional to the particles deposited energy. Further the integral of the energy depositions of the particles accumulated in the detector during the measurement interval allowed calculation of the dose rate.

References 
 

Scientific instruments
Space program of Bulgaria
Interkosmos program